Md. Sanowar Hossain (মোঃ ছানোয়ার হোসেন) is a Bangladesh Awami League politician and the incumbent Member of Parliament from Tangail-5.

Early life
Hossain was born on 1 February 1970. He has a B.A. degree.

Career
Hossain was elected to Parliament from Tangail-5 as a candidate of the  Awami League in 2014. The election was boycotted by the opposition Bangladesh Nationalist Party.

Obaidul Quader, the general secretary of the Awami League, slapped Hossain after he defended Hasan Imam Khan from criticism. Quader described both as touts.

Hossain was re-elected to Parliament from Tangail-5 as a candidate of the Awami League in 2018. He received 149,362 votes while his closest rival, Mahmudul Hasan of the Bangladesh Nationalist Party, received 78,992 votes.

References

Awami League politicians
Living people
1970 births
10th Jatiya Sangsad members
11th Jatiya Sangsad members